Melody Gardot (born February 2, 1985) is an American jazz singer.

At the age of 19, Gardot was involved in a bicycle accident and sustained a head injury. Music played a critical role in her recovery. She became an advocate of music therapy, visiting hospitals and universities to discuss its benefits. In 2012, she gave her name to a music therapy program in New Jersey.

Early life and education
Gardot was born in New Jersey and was brought up by her grandparents. Her grandmother was a Polish immigrant. Her mother, a photographer, traveled often, so they had few possessions and lived out of suitcases. Gardot studied fashion at the Community College of Philadelphia.

Accident and therapy
While riding her bicycle in Philadelphia in November 2003, Gardot was struck by an SUV and sustained head, spinal, and pelvic injuries. Confined to a hospital bed for a year, she needed to relearn simple tasks and was left oversensitive to light and sound. Suffering from short- and long-term memory loss, she struggled with her sense of time.

Encouraged by a physician who believed music would help heal her brain, Gardot learned to hum, then to sing into a tape recorder, and eventually to write songs.

For several years, she traveled with a physiotherapist and carried a transcutaneous electrical nerve stimulator to reduce pain.

Given her oversensitivity to sound, she chose quieter music. On the treadmill, she listened to bossa nova by Stan Getz, specifically "The Girl from Ipanema". Unable to sit comfortably at the piano, she learned to play guitar on her back. During her recovery, she wrote songs that became part of the self-produced EP Some Lessons: The Bedroom Sessions. Gardot was reluctant to record her songs at first, stating that they were too private for the public to hear, but relented and allowed her songs to be played on a Philadelphia radio station.

Personal life
Gardot is a Buddhist, macrobiotic cook, and humanitarian. She speaks fluent French in addition to her native English and considers herself a "citizen of the world".

Music career 

Gardot started music lessons at the age of nine and began playing piano in Philadelphia bars at the age of 16 on Fridays and Saturdays for four hours a night. She insisted on playing only music she liked, such as The Mamas & the Papas, Duke Ellington, and Radiohead.

During her time in the hospital she learned how to play the guitar and began writing songs, which were made available as downloads on iTunes and released on Some Lessons: The Bedroom Sessions in 2005. She began to play these songs at venues in Philadelphia and was noticed by employees of the radio station WXPN, operated by the University of Pennsylvania in Philadelphia, which helped to start the career of Norah Jones. She was encouraged to send a demo tape to the radio station, and the tape found its way to the Universal Music Group. She released her first album, Worrisome Heart (Verve, 2006), then My One and Only Thrill (Verve 2009), produced by Larry Klein.

Discography

Studio albums

Extended plays

Live albums

Singles
 "Worrisome Heart" (2008)
 "Goodnite" (2008)
 "Quiet Fire" (2008)
 "Who Will Comfort Me" (2009)
 "Baby I'm a Fool" (2009)
 "If the Stars Were Mine" (2009)
 "Your Heart Is as Black as Night" (2011)
 "Mira" (2012)
 "Amalia" (2012)
 "La vie en rose" (2012)
 "Same to You" (2015)
 "Preacherman" (2015)
 "It Gonna Come" (2016)
 "From Paris with Love" (2020)
 "Little Something" (featuring Sting) (2020)
 "Sunset in the Blue" (2020)
 "C'est Magnifique" (featuring Antonio Zambujo) (2020)

Collaborations 
Gardot appears on the following songs, on vocals and occasionally piano or guitar, by other artists:
 Beaucoup Blue – "Bluer Than a Midnight Sky" on Free to Fall
 Till Brönner – "High Night (Alta Noite)" on RIO (2008)
 Charlie Haden Quartet West – "If I'm Lucky" on Sophisticated Ladies (EmArcy, 2010)
 Seth Kallen & The Reaction – "My Sweet Darling" on Exhibit A
 Phil Roy – "A Meditation on War and the Fight for Love" on The Great Longing
 Eddy Mitchell – "Derrière l'arc-en-ciel / Over the Rainbow" on Grand ecran
 Juliette Gréco – "Sous les ponts de Paris (Under the Bridges of Paris)" on Ça se traverse et c'est beau (Feb. 2012)
 Jesse Harris – "Tant pis" on Sub Rosa (July 2012)
 Baptiste Trotignon – "Mon fantôme" on Song Song Song (Sept. 2012)
 Lizanne Knott – "There Are Angels" on Marionette (Sept. 2012, UK release)
 Federico Aubele – "Somewhere Else" on 5 (Fall 2013)
 Pierre Aderne – "Limoeiro" and "Melodia e Letra" on Caboclo (2014/2015)
 Vinicius Cantuária – "Insensatez" on Vinicius canta Antonio Carlos Jobim (2015)
 "He's a tramp" and "The Bare Necessities" on Jazz loves Disney (2016)
 "C'est trop tard"  on Elles & Barbara (2017)
 "The King of 52nd Street" on The Passion Of Charlie Parker (2017)
 "La Chanson Des Vieux Amants" on "Brel - Ces gens-lá" (2019)
 "La javanaise" on "Les pianos de Gainsbourg" by André Manoukian (2021)
 "Waiting", "Rio Negro", "How Long", and "Surpresa" on Surpresa by Jesse Harris & Vincicius Cantuaria (2021)

Notes

References

External links 
 Melody Gardot official website

1985 births
Living people
Musicians from Philadelphia
Singers from Pennsylvania
Community College of Philadelphia alumni
American women jazz singers
American jazz singers
American people with disabilities
American people of Polish descent
21st-century American women singers
Ballad musicians
Jazz musicians from Pennsylvania
21st-century American singers